Captain Henry William Newman Fane, OBE, JP, DL (6 February 1897 – 23 May 1976) was an English local politician who served as Chairman of Kesteven County Council and High Sheriff of Lincolnshire.

Early life and family 
A member of the Fane family, Henry William Newman Fane was born on 6 February 1897, the eldest son of Colonel William Vere Reeve Fane (later King-Fane) (1868–1943), JP, DL, of Fulbeck Hall in Lincolnshire, and his wife, Helen Beatrice (died 1962), daughter of Thomas Houldsworth Newman.

On 14 December 1946, Fane married Dorothy Mary (died 1986), daughter of Alexander Ogilvy Findlay, of Llantarmam in Monmouthshire; they had one daughter: Mary Helen (1947–2000), who married Michael Robin Fry, a graphic designer, and had issue.

Career 
Following schooling at Charterhouse and the Royal Military Academy, Woolwich, Fane joined the British Army, being commissioned into the Royal Horse and Royal Field Artillery in the Royal Regiment of Artillery as a second lieutenant on 22 April 1915. He served in World War I and was promoted to lieutenant in September 1919, before retiring in January 1923 with that rank. In 1937, he was appointed a justice of the peace and elected onto Kesteven County Council; in 1951, he became a deputy lieutenant, and the following year was appointed High Sheriff of Lincolnshire and was elected by his fellow County Councillors to be an alderman. He was successively vice-chairman (1957–62) and chairman (1962–67) of Kesteven County Council, before chairing the Lincolnshire Police Authority in 1968. He was a long-term chairman of Sleaford Magistrates and a prominent member of the Divisional Conservative Association. Described by the Lincolnshire Echo as a "leading figure in Lincolnshire public and political life for many years", Fane was appointed an Officer of the Order of the British Empire in 1974. He died on 23 May 1976, aged 79.

References

Notes

Citations

1897 births
1976 deaths
People educated at Charterhouse School
High Sheriffs of Lincolnshire
Deputy Lieutenants of Lincolnshire
Officers of the Order of the British Empire
English landowners
Members of Kesteven County Council